Antonin Proust (15 March 183220 March 1905) was a French journalist and politician.

Antonin Proust was born at Niort, Deux-Sèvres. In the 1840s, Proust attended the Collège Rollin where he met lifelong friend Édouard Manet. In September 1850, Proust and Manet joined the studio of Thomas Couture for artistic training.  In 1864, Proust founded an anti-imperial journal, La Semaine hebdomadaire which appeared in Brussels. He was war correspondent for Le Temps in the early days of the Franco-German War, but after the Battle of Sedan (1870) he returned to Paris, where he became secretary to Léon Gambetta and superintended the refugees in Paris.

He entered the Chamber of Deputies as representative for his native town in 1876, taking his seat on the left. In Gambetta's cabinet (1881–1882) he was minister of the fine arts, and in the Chamber of Deputies] he was regularly commissioned to draw up the budget for the fine arts, after the separate department had ceased to exist. Prosecuted in connection with the Panama scandals, he was acquitted in 1893. From this time he lived in the closest retirement. On 20 March 1905 he shot himself in the head, dying of the wound two days later.

He was not related to Marcel Proust, the famous writer.

References

1832 births
1905 suicides
People from Niort
Politicians of the French Third Republic
19th-century French journalists
Suicides by firearm in France
French male non-fiction writers
1905 deaths